This is a list of films produced by the Ollywood film industry based in Bhubaneshwar and Cuttack in 2008:

A-Z

References

2008
Ollywood
2000s in Orissa
2008 in Indian cinema